Cayley is a surname. Notable people with the surname include:

Arthur Cayley (1821–1895), British mathematician
Beverley Cochrane Cayley (1898–1928), Canadian lawyer and mountaineer
Charles Bagot Cayley (1823–1883), British linguist and friend of Christina Rossetti
Edward Stillingfleet Cayley, MP
Forde Everard de Wend Cayley (1915-2004), British physician held as a Japanese prisoner of war during the Second World War
Henry Cayley (1834-1904), Deputy Surgeon-General and the British army in India, honorary surgeon to Queen Victoria and King Edward VII
G. C. Cayley (1866–1944), senior Royal Navy and Royal Air Force officer
Sir George Cayley (1773–1857), English naturalist, physical scientist, engineer, inventor, politician, and pioneer of flight
Hugh Cayley, Canadian journalist and politician, son of William and namesake of the village in Alberta
Kate Cayley, Canadian writer and theatre director
Neville Henry Cayley (1853–1903), Australian artist
Neville William Cayley (1886–1950), Australian author, artist and amateur ornithologist
William Cayley (Canadian politician), Canadian politician, father of Hugh
William Cayley (MP) (1700-1768), British consul in Spain and Portugal and MP